"Misanthropy Pure" is the debut single from rock band Shai Hulud from their third album Misanthropy Pure.

A music video was made for the song, directed by David Brodsky. The video aired a number of times on MTV2's Headbangers Ball and was chosen as viewer's choice. It features text-treatments of many of the song's lyrics.  Lyrics have long been considered one of Shai Hulud's strongest elements and when discussing the video with Brodsky, Matt Fox suggested that they be highlighted in some way or other. It is, reportedly, the first formal music video that Shai Hulud has made.

Trivia
 At 4:21 in the video you can see the text "(death to ming)" next to Matt Fox. It is Matt Fox's email signature and a reference to Flash Gordon.  Brodsky added it to amuse Fox on delivery of the rough cut.  Fox liked it enough to request it be bigger for the final version.
 The song also appears on the official soundtrack to the video game Saints Row: The Third, where it can be heard on the 106.66 The Blood, an extreme metal radio station.

External links

2008 songs
2008 singles
Shai Hulud songs